Flat Fork is a  long 2nd order tributary to Brown Creek in Anson County, North Carolina.

Course
Flat Fork rises about 0.5 miles northeast of Wadesboro, North Carolina.  Flat Fork then flows northeast to meet Brown Creek about 4 miles southeast of Ansonville, North Carolina.

Watershed
Flat Fork drains  of area, receives about 47.9 in/year of precipitation, has a topographic wetness index of 417.22 and is about 61% forested.

References

Rivers of North Carolina
Rivers of Anson County, North Carolina
Tributaries of the Pee Dee River